Alexander Nikolaevich Sidelnikov (August 12, 1950 – June 23, 2003) was a Soviet ice hockey player who played in the Soviet Hockey League. He played for Krylya Sovetov Moscow.  He was inducted into the Russian and Soviet Hockey Hall of Fame in 1976. He won a gold medal at the 1976 Winter Olympics.

References

External links
 
 Russian and Soviet Hockey Hall of Fame bio
 
 
 
 

1950 births
2003 deaths
Ice hockey players at the 1976 Winter Olympics
Ice hockey people from Moscow
Krylya Sovetov Moscow players
Olympic ice hockey players of the Soviet Union
Olympic gold medalists for the Soviet Union
Olympic medalists in ice hockey
Soviet ice hockey players
Burials in Troyekurovskoye Cemetery
Medalists at the 1976 Winter Olympics